Simeon Bulgaru (born 26 May 1985) is a Moldovan football manager and former player. He is an assistant coach with the Moldova under-21 national team.

Club career
Bulgaru began his career with Zimbru Chișinău. After three years with the senior side, he joined to FC Sheriff Tiraspol in January 2007.

After one year with the club in January 2008 transferred from Sheriff Tiraspol to Viborg FF in the Danish Superliga. After two and a half years in Denmark, he was sold to Alania Vladikavkaz from Russia.

On 27 February 2013, he signed a one-and-a-half-year contract with Volga Nizhny Novgorod.

International career
Bulgaru was a member of the Moldova national team from 2007 to 2013.

Managerial career

Zimbru Chișinău
On 10 June 2020, Bulgaru was announced as the new assistant coach of FC Zimbru Chișinău, with Vlad Goian being announced as head coach.

On 16 October 2020, Bulgaru became interim head coach after Vlad Goian left the role. Bulgaru resigned from his position and left the club in January 2021.

Career statistics
Scores and results list Moldova's goal tally first, score column indicates score after each Bulgaru goal.

References

External links

Profile on football-lineups.com

1985 births
Living people
Moldovan footballers
Footballers from Chișinău
Association football defenders
Moldova international footballers
Moldovan Super Liga players
Danish Superliga players
Danish 1st Division players
Russian Premier League players
Russian First League players
Kazakhstan Premier League players
FC Sheriff Tiraspol players
Viborg FF players
FC Spartak Vladikavkaz players
FC Volga Nizhny Novgorod players
FC Zimbru Chișinău players
FC Irtysh Pavlodar players
FC Dacia Chișinău players
Moldovan football managers
FC Zimbru Chișinău managers
Moldovan Super Liga managers
Moldovan expatriate footballers
Moldovan expatriate sportspeople in Denmark
Expatriate men's footballers in Denmark
Moldovan expatriate sportspeople in Russia
Expatriate footballers in Russia
Moldovan expatriate sportspeople in Kazakhstan
Expatriate footballers in Kazakhstan